The Persian legislative election of 1923 was held in November 1923 after the appointment of Reza Pahlavi as Prime Minister by Ahmad Shah Qajar. It was the last election in the Qajar dynasty. Parliament opened on 11 February 1924.

During the elections, Reza Khan used the military to manipulate the elections in many tribal constituencies and gave allied Revival Party and Socialist Party majority. Only elections in Tehran was not manipulated.

References

1923 elections in Asia
Legislative
Electoral fraud in Iran
National Consultative Assembly elections
Politics of Qajar Iran